Mark Woods may refer to:

 Mark Woods (sportswriter) (born 1972), sports writer and broadcaster based in Edinburgh, UK
 Mark Woods (rugby league), New Zealand former professional rugby league footballer
 Mark Kenneth Woods (born 1977), Canadian writer, actor, producer and director

See also
Marc Woods, British swimmer and Paralympian
Mark Wood (disambiguation)